is a Japanese professional footballer who plays as a forward for Mito HollyHock.

References

External links

1996 births
Living people
Japanese footballers
Association football forwards
Mito HollyHock players
J2 League players